Khanavar Sara (also Romanized as Khānāvar Sarā) is a village in Otaqvar Rural District, Otaqvar District, Langarud County, Gilan Province, Iran. At the 2006 census, its population was 18, in 5 families.

References 

Populated places in Langarud County